Carlos Alfredo Gómez Astudillo (born 14 February 1992) is a Chilean professional footballer who plays as a defensive midfielder for Bolivian club Destroyers.

Career
Born in Santiago, Gómez joined Cobreloa youth system at the age of 10 in his city of birth and moved to Calama in 2009, making his professional debut in a Chilean Primera División match against Santiago Morning on 31 October 2010, by replacing Alejandro Kruchowski.

After playing for Cobreloa until the first half 2016 in the Primera B, he played for Unión Española in the 2016–17 Primera División season. In the second half of 2017, he played for Deportes Iquique in the same division. 

In 2018, he returned to Santiago Morning after having played for them in the 2014–15 Primera B season. In 2019 he played on loan at Bolívar, winning the 2019 Apertura.

In March 2022 he was going to join Argentine club , but he rejected the option by signing with Bolivian club Destroyers to play in the Copa Simón Bolívar.

Personal life
Due to his haircut, he has gotten many nicknames, but he prefers Puyol del Desierto (Puyol from Desert) for being related to football because of his resemblance to Spanish former footballer Carles Puyol.

Honours
Bolívar
 Bolivian Primera División: 2019 Apertura

References

External links
 
 
 Carlos Gómez at PlaymakerStats

1992 births
Living people
Footballers from Santiago
Chilean footballers
Chilean expatriate footballers
Cobreloa footballers
Santiago Morning footballers
Unión Española footballers
Deportes Iquique footballers
Club Bolívar players
Club Destroyers players
Chilean Primera División players
Primera B de Chile players
Bolivian Primera División players
Chilean expatriate sportspeople in Bolivia
Expatriate footballers in Bolivia
Association football midfielders